Deh-e Davai (also Romanized as Deh-e Da‘vā’ī and Deh Da‘vā’ī; also known as Da‘vā’ī and Davā’ī) is a village in Saadatabad Rural District, Pariz District, Sirjan County, Kerman Province, Iran. At the 2006 census, its population was 56, in 11 families.

References 

Populated places in Sirjan County